BC Nokia is a professional basketball club based in Nokia, Finland. The team currently plays in the top level Korisliiga.

History
In the 2014–15 season, Nokia won the Finnish First Division and was promoted to the Korisliiga. The team finished in the 8th place in its first Korisliiga season, but defeated 1st seed Kataja BC in the first round. The team was defeated in the semi-finals, but did manage to claim the bronze medal for the 2015–16 season.

Honours
Finnish First Division
Champions (1): 2014–15

Korisliiga
Third place (1): 2015–16

Season by season

References

External links
Official website

Nokia, BC
Nokia, Finland
Basketball teams established in 1997